Gareth Joseph Evans (born 15 February 1981) is a former professional footballer who played in the Football League as a full back for Leeds United, Huddersfield Town and Blackpool. He was forced to retire at the age of 24 because of a longstanding knee injury.

Career
Evans started his career as a trainee at his hometown club Leeds United. In 1997, he was an unused substitute as a Leeds side including future internationals Jonathan Woodgate, Paul Robinson and Harry Kewell won the FA Youth Cup, and he went on to be capped by England at under-18 level. He made his first-team debut in the Olympic Stadium in Munich, as a substitute in a Champions League qualifier against 1860 Munich in August 2000, but made only one more first-team appearance for Leeds before leaving to join Huddersfield Town on a free transfer in August 2001. He assisted the Terriers in finishing in sixth place in Division Two, thus reaching the play-offs. Injury kept him out for the whole of the 2002–03 season, at the end of which he was released.

After a trial with the club, Evans then signed for Blackpool, initially on a monthly contract, then on a one-year deal with an option for a further year. He missed the Seasiders' victory in the 2004 Football League Trophy with a broken foot which cut short his season, but the club still took up the option on his contract. Once he regained his place in the 2004–05 season, he played in a 10-match unbeaten run, but in February 2005 he sustained a knee injury which required surgery. His contract was extended for another year in May 2005, but he never played again for the club, and retired from the professional game in 2006. He went on to work in marketing for electronics distributor Premier Farnell.

References

External links

Profile and photo at Sporting Heroes

1981 births
Living people
English footballers
Footballers from Leeds
Association football defenders
Leeds United F.C. players
Huddersfield Town A.F.C. players
Blackpool F.C. players
Premier League players
English Football League players